Marquette Senior High School (MSHS) is a public, coeducational high school located in Marquette, Michigan, serving grades 9–12. The school enrolled 968 students in 2021-22, making it the largest high school in the Upper Peninsula.

History 
Marquette's first high school was constructed in 1859 on property given to the city by Morgan Hewitt. Located on the corner of Pine and Ridge Streets, the community initially opposed the project because it was "on the edge of the wilderness." Nevertheless, the red brick building with separate entrances for boys and girls was used until 1875, when it was torn down and replaced with a larger brownstone building in 1878.

After fire claimed the brownstone in February 1900, the Howard High School (named after John M. Longyear's son) was constructed in 1902 along with an elementary school and a manual training building. However, the school had been built to accommodate 200 students, but reached an enrollment of nearly 400 by 1915, so the community began a search for a new site.

Harriet K. Adams, widow of pioneer Sidney Adams, donated land on the corner of Front and Hewitt streets for a new high school, and gave $2,500 for gymnasium equipment, but World War I postponed those plans until 1923.

In 1925, voters approved a bond issue of $475,000 to build the new high school on the 8 lots on Front Street between Ohio Street and Hewitt Avenue (as well as expand the Fisher School). Louis Kaufman donated $26,000 to the school board to replace the funds it had spent on land acquisition, so that more money could be spent on construction. In appreciation, the board voted unanimously to name the school after Kaufman's mother, Juliet Graveraet; they later named the auditorium after Kaufman himself.

Graveraet High School was replaced in 1964 by the present structure at Fair and Lincoln avenues.

Demographics 
The demographic breakdown of the 968 students enrolled in 2021-22 was:

 Male – 51.5%
 Female – 48.5%
 Native American – 2.1%
 Asian – 0.5%
 Black – 0.8%
 Hispanic – 1.4%
 Native Hawaiian/Pacific Islander – 0.3%
 White – 88.6%
 Multiracial – 6.2%

In addition, 215 students (22.2%) were eligible for reduced-price or free lunch

Athletics
The Marquette Senior High School's athletic program is known as the Redmen and Redettes. The school's first State Championship award came in the fall of 1976 with the Girls Basketball Team coached by Barb Crill. The team was also honored several years later by the MHSAA as "Legends of the Game". The ice hockey team won the 1977,1988, 1995, 2004 and 2008 (tied) MHSAA state championships. The girls downhill ski team took the state titles in 1999–2004, 2008, 2009, and 2016. The boys downhill ski team were the state champs in 1997, 2000–2003, 2006, 2009, and 2013–2016. The Girls Swimming and Diving team have been the UP champions 21 times (1980, 1981, 1989–1993, 1995–1997, 2002–2012).

The MHSAA designates Marquette Senior High as a Class "A" school. This makes it the only Class A school in the Upper Peninsula.

Notable alumni
Gus Sonnenberg (1915): member of the 1928 NFL championship team Providence Steam Roller, multi-time professional wrestling World Heavyweight Champion 
Bob Chase (1943): play-by-play broadcaster for the Fort Wayne Komets
Chris Thorpe (1988): Olympic silver medalist in luge doubles, Nagano, Japan, 1998.
Vernon Forrest (1991): member of 1992 United States Olympic Boxing Team, welterweight and light-heavyweight world champion
Shani Davis (2000): two-time Olympic gold medalist in speed skating (2006, 2010).

References

External links
Marquette Senior High School
Marquette Area Public Schools

Public high schools in Michigan
Educational institutions established in 1965
Schools in Marquette County, Michigan
1965 establishments in Michigan